Jeffery  Richard (Jeff) Hearn (born 5 August 1947) is a British sociologist, and Research Professor at the University of Huddersfield, and Professor at the Hanken School of Economics.

Biography 
Hearn obtained his MA at the University of Oxford in 1973 and another MA in Organisational Sociology at the University of Leeds in 1974, and his PhD in Social Theory, Social Planning and Theories of Patriarchy at the University of Bradford in 1986.

Hearn has been Lecturer, Senior-Lecturer, Research Fellow, Visiting Professor, Professor and the like at universities in Bradford, Manchester, Sunderland, Åbo and elsewhere. He is currently teaching as a professor at the "Hanken School of Economics" in Helsinki and Linköping University, Sweden. He is also Professor of Sociology, Huddersfield University, and a UK Academician in the Social Sciences.

Jeff Hearn is a member of the British Sociological Association, since 2005 member of the Conference and Events Committee of BSA. He is co-editor of Men and Masculinities, managing co-editor of Routledge Advances in Feminist Studies and Intersectionality, and associate editor of many other journals.

Work 
Hearn's research interests range from critical studies on men, including men's violences to women and children; Sociology of organisations and management, including gender, sexuality and violence in and around organisations; Globalisation and transnationalism, with a focus on men, organisations, management and social welfare; and social theory; to sociology of culture.

First publications 
His first published book was in 1983, a materialist analysis of men's relations to children, followed by the book, "'Sex' at 'Work'", authored with Wendy Parkin, in 1987, on the power and paradox of 'organisation sexuality', a book on sexuality in organisations, and then "The Gender of Oppression", a neo-marxist, pro-feminist critique of contemporary patriarchy in the same year.

His later books include "Men in the Public Eye" (Routledge, 1992), "The Violences of Men" (Sage, 1998), "European Perspectives on Men and Masculinities" (with Keith Pringle and members of CROME, Palgrave Macmillan, 2006, 2009).

A review of some of his work on men and masculinities is to be found in the book: Fidelma Ashe 'The New Politics of Masculinity', Routledge, 2006, and another on his work with Wendy Parkin on gender, sexuality and organisations in the book: Tommy Jensen and Timothy L: Wilson (eds.) On the Shoulders of Giants, Studentlitteratur, 2011.

Critical studies on men 
With David Morgan, Colin Creighton, Chris Middleton, Ray Thomas and Clive Pearson, he initiated some ground rules for the study of men and masculinity, published as 'Changing men's sexist practice in sociology', Network, No 25, January 1983. Following work in the Men and Masculinity Research/Study Group at Bradford, the principles were developed and published in Achilles' Heel in 1987, and 3 years later Hearn and Morgan appended a sixth in the book "Men, Masculinities and Social Theory".

Research and politics 
Hearn took part on several projects of different governments, political institutions and ngos, e.g.:
 EU-Project CROME – Critical Research On Men In Europe, a comparative studies of the situation of men in Europe.
 National Expert, Ministry of Foreign Affairs, Finland, Seminar for Joint Project between the United States and Finland concerning the Advancement of Women in the Baltic Countries, Riga, March 1999.
 Member of international expert group for UNICEF, Swedish Government and SIDA (Swedish International Development Cooperation Agency) Ending Gender-based Violence (2001–2004) presented to UN March 2004.
 Invited by Amnesty Finland to provide public responses on "Questions on violence" as part of international anti-violence Internet campaign.
 Founder member and member of Board of profeministimiehet in 1999, a profeminist group of men in Helsinki.

Selected publications 
 
 
 
 
 
 
 
  Paperback, 2009 
 
 
 
 
 
  Pdf.

References

External links 
 Professor Jeff Hearn - Profile at University of Huddersfield

1947 births
British sociologists
Alumni of the University of Leeds
Alumni of the University of Bradford
Academics of the University of Bradford
Living people
People educated at Colfe's School
Academic staff of Örebro University
Academic staff of the Hanken School of Economics